The British Baizai district is a bay about 20 miles long and 12 miles broad, which runs into the hills between the Paja and Malakand ranges at the extreme N.W. of the Yusufzai division of the Peshawur district. It is inhabited by Baizai, Swati, Utmankhel and Khattak, with some Mohmand, Rowanri, etc. The last of these claim to be Pathans, and there is no great family of khans in Baizai. On the fifth and 14 December 1849, Colonel Bradshaw led an expedition against those in British territory, in which he 

attacked and destroyed the villages of Sangao in British Baizai', and Palai Zormandai and Sherkhana in Swat Baizai.

The Baizai division of Swat is south of the Mora range and north of Lundkhor. It is called Sam Baizai, to distinguish it from Baizai in the Swat valley, and comprises the villages of Palai, Sherkhana, Jalalpur, Zormandai, Bazdara, and Mora Banda, each with its separate khan.

Gujar herdsmen are in hamlets scattered over the Mora mountain.

The Osman Khel or Utman Khel are a Pathan tribe who occupy the hills north of Peshawur, between the Mohmand and Ranizai, on both sides of the Swat river, from the Koh-i-Mora to the Khanora mountain. They are descendants of Utman Baba, who accompanied Mahmud of Ghazni on his expedition into Hindustan in the year 997, and settled in this country. They have five khel or sections, descendants from his five sons. They are a powerful tribe, and, according. to Turner, can muster 17,000 fighting men ; Mount Stuart Elphinstone says 10,000, and Bellew 5000. Their country is very hilly generally. They are all at feud with the people of Bajawar ; in 1827 and 1850 they engaged the Mohmands. They are a tall, stout, and fair race, are sober but uncivilised, and have frequent quarrels amongst themselves. They provided refuge to Khushal Khan Khattak at Barmol banda (north east of Khui Barmol) while he was at war with Emperor Aurangzeb mughals and his own son. He mentions Barmol,s beauty in one of his verse. Also they gave much trouble to the British frontier, and in 1852 afforded an asylum to and aided the fugitive Khan of Tangi ; on 'which a force under Sir Colin Campbell proceeded against them in May, and their principal villages, Pranghar and Nawadand, were taken and destroyed after a determined resistance. Since then the Utman Khel have never given any trouble.

The Utman Khel or clan who inhabit the northern portion of the Baizai division of Yusuf zai are probably a section of the above tribe. They have three clans,—Ismail, Daulat, and Seh sada. Their villages are strongly situated in the nooks and corners of spurs running down front the Paja and Mora ridges, and the people are as wild as the hills they inhabit. Their conduct has been, on the whole, more consistently mulish and refractory than that of any other village along the whole border from Abbottabad to Jacobabad. They began to give trouble in 1847, and up to 1872 they continued in it. In 1849 a force under Colonel Bradshaw destroyed the village of Sangao belonging to the Dawat Khel. In 1855 the same village was fined Rs. 200, on account of some robberies and molestation of travellers, and the village was removed from its hill position, and its two sections located respectively in the more accessible villages of Pipal and Mian Khan; but during the troubles of the mutiny they crept back again. In 1859 they sheltered some criminals, and opposed the attempt made to seize them.

In 1863 six of their villages furnished men to oppose the British force which was sent on the Ambela campaign, and they were fined Rs. 2500 ; after which they were disturbed by internal frictions, with regular fight, on 21 August, 25 and 29 September, 3 and 21 October 1864, in which the British did not interfere. In November and December Lieutenant Ommaney unsuccessfully endeavoured to induce them to make peace; but in February 1865 Captain Monro was more successful, and fines were imposed. In 1865 quarrels broke out afresh among them, and on 16 January 1866 a force of 4000 men and 12 guns, under Brigadier - General Beresford, C.B., was sent amongst them. The villages of Miankhel and Sangao, and other villages, were destroyed, and new sites fixed for them. In 1872, however, some of the clans evacuated the villages of Kui, Barmul, and Mian Khan, and as they refused to return or to obey the authorities, the houses of the Khui ringleaders and entire Barmol and a Ranizai hamlet in its vicinity were pulled down. The people from Barmol were shifted to more accessible area, where Khui existed. Elephants were used to pull down their houses. Trakai village which was situated 3 miles west of Khui was also destroyed and people shifted to Khui.

The Ranizai are a subdivision of the Baizai Akozai division of the Yusufzai clan. The country they inhabit is divided into the Sam Ranizai and Bar or Swat Ranizai. A village of Ranizai the situated in the north east mountain fringes of present-day Mardan district N.E of Khui Barmol)  was pulled down in 1872 and they fled to lower Swat. The latter is the lowest or most westerly part of the Swat valley, in which they have thirty-five villages. Sam Ranizai is an extensive district, stretching over the Totai Hills, and includes the whole of the lower end of the Swat valley, in which there are about thirty khel or clans. On the annexation of the Panjab in 1849, it was found that the Sam Ranizai country was being made a refuge for malcontent criminals of every description, who periodically made raids on British territory. In 1852 the Ranizai Swati attacked a detachment of the Guide Corps, and a force under Sir Colin Campbell was marched to their village, on which the Ranizai maliks of Shahkot submitted, were fined Rs. 5000, and gave ten hostages. The force then marched towards the British territory ; but as the Ranizai refused to pay the fine, and repudiated the hostages, whose families they expelled from their territory, on 18 May Sir Colin returned to Shahkot, and found his force opposed by about 4000 infantry and 500 cavalry, all from Swat, in addition to the armed villagers. The king and the akhund of Swat had stationed themselves on the crest of the Malakand pass to witness the fight. After a slight resistance, the Swat troops broke and fled, leaving 300 of their number dead on the field. The village and its granaries were then destroyed, and from the 20th to 24th twelve other villages were similarly destroyed, and the British force returned through Lundkhor to Gujargarhi. In June they tendered submission, and all that was required of them was to behave peaceably. Since that time the Ranizai people have fulfilled all their engagements, and have evinced an anxiety to maintain peace.

References 

Military history of British India